Castagnito is a comune (municipality) in the Province of Cuneo in the Italian region Piedmont, located about  southeast of Turin and about  northeast of Cuneo. It is part of the Roero historical region.
Here was born Maria Teresa Merlo.

References

Cities and towns in Piedmont
Roero